The National Association of Corporate Directors (NACD) is an independent, not-for-profit, section 501(c)(3) founded in 1977 and headquartered in Arlington, Virginia. NACD's membership includes the entire boards of 1,700+ corporations as well as several thousand individual members, for a total of more than 23,000 members. Membership is open to individuals serving on boards of public, private, and nonprofit organizations from both the United States and overseas. The organization is registered with the National Association of State Boards of Accountancy as a sponsor of continuing professional education on the National Registry of CPE Sponsors.

NACD operates at both a national and local level, with more than 20 chapters across 35 major metropolitan cities within the United States providing educational programs and networking opportunities.

The organization collaborates with various other organizations such as Heidrick & Struggles, KPMG's Audit Committee Institute, Marsh & McLennan Companies, Pearl Meyer & Partners, and Sidley Austin.

History
NACD was founded in 1977 with the goal to educate directors. In 1978 it announced the first comprehensive Director Education Program. Ten years later, NACD recognized the first Director of the Year. In 1993, NACD published its first Blue Ribbon Commission Report, offering ten principles to guide audit committees and their oversight of financial reporting as well as risk management and internal and external auditors. In the early 2000s, NACD's Blue Ribbon Commission Report on Board Evaluations helped optimize board composition, while the organization helped shape Sarbanes-Oxley and influence the new New York Stock Exchange (NYSE) and NASDAQ listing rules. In 2004, NACD co-found the Global Director Development Circle, launched in response to the need to keep directors ahead of international corporate governance and legislation. This program led NACD to globalize the Certificate of Director Education program in 2006. The program has since evolved into the Global Network of Director Institutes. In 2010, NACD acquired Directorship magazine, a magazine dedicated for today's corporate officers and board of directors.

Mission
NACD's mission, as stated on its website, is to elevate board performance by providing the information and insights that board members need to confidently navigate business challenges and enhance shareowner value.

Advocacy
NACD serves as a resource during the legislative process by regularly sending research, publications and comment letters to the United States Congress, the United States Security and Exchange Commission and the Public Company Accounting Oversight Board. NACD employees have testified and conferred with key committees as they prepare for Congressional hearings. Research provided by NACD is cited in the legislative and regulatory arenas, providing statistics regarding boards as well as leading practices addressing key issues, such as boardroom compensation.

Courses and events
NACD delivers more than 400 programs nationwide to 22,000+ directors each year. These include national and chapter events, foundation courses, annual Summit, peer to peer roundtables, specialty events, and online learning opportunities.

NACD summit 
NACD's annual summit is the largest and most influential director forum in the world. The event gathers thousands of directors each year.

Special events 
NACD specialty programming includes signature annual events and new programming to reflect emerging trends in the directorship field. These events include From Battlefield to Boardroom, NACD Directorship 100, and the NACD NXT Gala.

Foundation courses 
NACD offers director education courses as the foundation of two NACD credentials, NACD Fellowship and NACD Directorship Certification.

Director Professionalism is the prerequisite course for certification and provides directors with boardroom fundamentals.

Experienced directors looking to become NACD Board Leadership Fellows must attend NACD Master Class. The course offers fireside chats with prominent CEOs, analysis of emerging disruptions, and a forum for candid discussions with director peers.

Virtual learning 
NACD's virtual learning programs offer comprehensive education for current and aspiring boardroom leaders. Programs include webinars, Directorship Essentials Series, and the Art of Directorship Series.

Peer-to-peer programs 
NACD offers various peer programming throughout the year. Programs include Advisory Councils, General Counsel programming, and Chapter programs.

Credentials 
NACD enables directors to earn credentials that demonstrate a commitment to continuous learning and board leadership. NACD aims to help directors stay ahead of emerging issues and connect with a distinguished network of NACD-credentialed directors.

NACD directorship certification 
NACD's directorship certification is the premier US-based certification program designed to qualify corporate directors for effective boardroom performance. Based on a professional examination and continuing education, this certification verifies that directors possess the knowledge, expertise, and skills needed to discharge their fiduciary responsibilities as board members.

NACD fellowship 
The NACD Board Leadership Fellowship program provides experienced board leaders with a pathway of continuous insights, boardroom intelligence, and leading boardroom practices.

Cyber Risk Oversight Certificate 
NACD has partnered with the CERT Division of the Software Engineering Institute at Carnegie Mellon University and Ridge Global to develop the Cyber-Risk Oversight Program. This program is designed for directors who wish to enhance their understanding of enterprise cyber-risk issues. The course confers the CERT Certificate in Cybersecurity Oversight, a tangible credential that demonstrates a commitment to cybersecurity literacy.

Resources
 NACD Director Compensation Report: analyzes annual pay levels and practices among 1,400 companies across 24 industries with revenue from $50 million to more than $10 billion. NACD and Pearl Meyer & Partners annually release the NACD Director Compensation Report.
 NACD Fortune 500 Committee Chair Advisory Council Briefs: NACD regularly convenes Fortune 500 board committee chairs, investors, regulators, and leading governance professionals to discuss key issues impacting the audit, compensation, nominating and governance and risk committees.
 Annual Governance Surveys: annual surveys of more than 1,000 public, private and nonprofit directors on leading governance practices.
 NACD Directorship Magazine: the official magazine of NACD, reporting on current issues of importance to directors and boards.
 NACD Director Handbook Series: guidance on issues such as cyber-risk oversight, corporate sustainability, effective director onboarding practices and other topics.

Role in the corporate governance movement
In 2001 and 2002, the unexpected bankruptcies of Enron and WorldCom brought increased public and government attention to corporate governance and the role of the board of directors.  In February 2002, Roger Raber, former CEO of NACD, was called to testify before House Energy and Commerce Committee, chaired by Billy Tauzin (R-LA), regarding the failure of Enron Corporation.  At request of Committee,  Raber submitted 10 suggested standards, based on the Report of the NACD Blue Ribbon Commission on Director Professionalism (1996/2001/2005), for public company governance, submitting same to the New York Stock Exchange (NYSE) and the NASDAQ on May 1, 2002. In November 2003, the Securities and Exchange Commission approved new listing requirements for both, which were influenced by NACD's recommendations.

The ten core recommendations are as follows:

 Boards should be composed of a substantial majority of independent directors. At a minimum, these directors should meet the definition of “independent director” as defined under relevant SRO standards, although boards may consider adopting even more stringent standards of independence. Furthermore, boards should formulate and adhere to clear conflict of interest policies applicable to all board members.
 Boards should require that key committees—including but not limited to audit, compensation, and governance/nominating—be composed entirely of independent directors, and are free to hire independent advisors as necessary.
 Each key committee should have a board-approved written charter detailing its duties. Audit committee duties, at a minimum, should include two key elements: a) oversight of the quality and integrity of financial reports and the process that produces them; b) oversight of the management of risk. Compensation committee duties should include performance goals that align the pay of managers with the long-term interests of shareholders. Governance/nominating committee duties should include setting board and committee performance goals and nominating directors and committee members with the qualifications and time to meet these goals.
 Boards should consider formally designating an independent director as chairman or lead director. If they do not make such a designation, they should designate, regardless of title, an independent member to lead the board in its most critical functions, including setting board agendas with the CEO, evaluating CEO and board performance, holding executive sessions, and anticipating and responding to corporate crises.
 Boards should regularly and formally evaluate the performance of the CEO, other senior managers, the board as a whole, and individual directors. Independent directors should control the methods and criteria for this evaluation.
 Boards should review the adequacy of their companies’ compliance and reporting systems at least annually. In particular, boards should ensure that management pays strict attention to ethical behavior and compliance with laws and regulations, approved auditing and accounting principles, and with internal governing documents. In addition to meeting the current requirements for disclosure of management compensation, boards should disclose the total value of each director's compensation, including the value of any stock options or grants awarded during the year.
 Boards should adopt a policy of holding periodic sessions of independent directors only. These meetings should provide board and committee members the opportunity to react to management proposals and/or actions in an environment free from formal or informal constraints.
 Audit committees should meet independently with both the internal and independent auditors.
 Boards should be constructively engaged with management to ensure the appropriate development, execution, monitoring, and modification of their companies’ strategies. The nature and extent of the board's involvement in strategy will depend on the particular circumstances of the company and the industry or industries in which it is operating.
 Boards should provide new directors with a director orientation program to familiarize them with their companies’ business, industry trends, and recommended governance practices. Boards should also ensure that directors are continually updated on these matters.

NACD and the Securities and Exchange Commission
 2003-2004 Former NACD CEO Roger Raber and former NACD Chair B. Kenneth West co-signed three letters on Re: File Number S7-19-03 “Security Holder Director Nominations” (34-48626).  During this time NACD Board member Warren Batts appeared at an SEC Roundtable devoted to the topic. 
 2005- 2006 NACD Director Michelle Hooper wrote a letter and participated twice at SEC-PCAOB Roundtables regarding internal control reporting and auditing provisions of Section 404 of the Sarbanes-Oxley Act. Another NACD Director, the Barbara Hackman Franklin, has similarly participated, under her own name, rather than as an NACD representative.
 2009 NACD President and CEO Ken Daly and Chair Barbara Hackman Franklin co-signed a letter to Elizabeth Murphy, Secretary of the U.S. Securities and Exchange Commission, commenting on the proposed rule on proxy disclosure and solicitation enhancements.
 2011 NACD President and CEO Ken Daly testified before the U.S. House of Representatives Subcommittee on Capital Markets and Government Sponsored Enterprises, commenting on the legislative proposals to address the negative consequences of the Dodd-Frank whistleblower provisions.
 2013 NACD President and CEO Ken Daly and Chair Reatha Clark King co-signed a letter to Elizabeth Murray, Secretary of the U.S. Securities and Exchange Commission, commenting on the proposed rule for pay ratio disclosure, issued by the SEC on September 18, 2013.

References

External links
 National Association of Corporate Directors Homepage

Business organizations based in the United States
Corporate governance in the United States
1977 establishments in the United States
Organizations established in 1977